Ferruccio Cerio (25 September 1904 – 23 April 1963) was an Italian film writer and director.

Filmography as a director
Il cavaliere senza nome (1941)
Villa da vendere (1941)
L'ultimo addio (1942) ( The Last Good-Bye)
The Count of Monte Cristo (1943) (supervising director)
La prigione (1944)
Rosalba (1944)
Posto di blocco (1945)
L'urlo (1948)
Cita con mi viejo corazón (1950)
O Noivo de Minha Mulher (1950)
La donna che inventò l'amore (1952) (a.k.a. The Woman Who Invented Love)
Il Sacco di Roma (1953) (a.k.a. The Pagans, The Barbarians)
Gioventù alla sbarra (1953)
 Tripoli, Beautiful Land of Love (1954)
El Diablo de vacaciones (1957)

References

External links

Italian film directors
1904 births
1963 deaths